A violent severe weather outbreak struck the Southeast on April 4–5, 1977. A total of 21 tornadoes touched down with the strongest ones occurring in Mississippi, Alabama, and Georgia. The strongest was a catastrophic F5 tornado that struck the Northern Birmingham, Alabama suburbs during the afternoon of Monday, April 4, 1977. In the end, the entire outbreak directly caused 24 deaths and over 200 injuries. The storm system also caused the crash of Southern Airways Flight 242, which killed 72 and injured 22.

Confirmed tornadoes

April 4 event

April 5 event

Birmingham–Smithfield, Alabama

Beginning just a few miles north of Birmingham near Tarrant, the tornado proceeded north through northern Jefferson County producing F5 damage in Smithfield, northeast of Ensley. Hundreds of homes were completely destroyed, many of which were completely swept away, despite being well-built. Some of the homes built into hillsides even had their cinder-block basement walls swept away. Many trees in the area were snapped and debarked and vehicles were thrown and destroyed. Two dump-trucks were thrown through the air near I-65 as well. Daniel Payne College suffered extensive damage, forcing it to permanently close due to the extent of the destruction. Ted Fujita followed the tornado and supercell from an airplane and while surveying damage; he rated the Smithfield tornado F5.

Other tornadoes

In addition to this tornado, several other tornadoes were reported from the same system in the Midwest, Alabama, Georgia, Mississippi and North Carolina. One tornado in Floyd County, Georgia, killed one person, and another fatality was reported east of Birmingham in St. Clair County. The severe weather that day also contributed to the crash of Southern Airways Flight 242, which crashed near New Hope, Georgia, killing 63 people.

The F5 tornado touched down near the end of the path of three other violent tornadoes that struck the Birmingham region in 1956, 1998, and 2011. The 1956 tornado was an F4 that struck McDonald Chapel, before continuing through Edgewater, northern Birmingham, Fultondale, and Tarrant before dissipating, killing 25. In 1998, an F5 tornado touched town in a rural area near Tuscaloosa before tearing through Rock Creek, Sylvan Springs, Edgewater and McDonald Chapel, killing 32. The 2011 tornado was an EF4 that devastated Tuscaloosa before impacting Concord, Pleasant Grove, McDonald Chapel, northern Birmingham, and Fultondale before lifting, killing 64 people.

Non-tornadic impacts
The storms that brought the tornadoes on April 4 also brought a large squall line across Alabama. This proved disastrous when Southern Airways Flight 242 attempted to fly around the storm and instead flew straight into it. Massive amounts of very large hail and very heavy rain battered the plane and destroyed its engines. With no way to keep flying, it attempted a landing on a stretch of highway in New Hope, Georgia. The road section used for the forced landing, formerly called Georgia State Route 92 Spur, is now called Dallas–Acworth Highway (formerly Georgia State Route 381). The DC-9 actually landed successfully, but then crashed into a gas station, grocery store, and other structures and vehicles during the rollout. The plane was destroyed, killing the flight crew, 60 passengers, and nine people on the ground.

See also
 List of F5 and EF5 tornadoes
 April 1998 Birmingham tornado 
 List of North American tornadoes and tornado outbreaks

References

External links
 Storm Data
 List of Birmingham, Alabama killer tornadoes
 April 4, 1977 tornado maps - Tornado History Project
 The Birmingham F5 tornado - Tornado History Project
 NWS Birmingham summary of the April 4, 1977 Smithfield tornado

F5 tornadoes
Tornadoes of 1977
Tornadoes in Mississippi
Tornadoes in Missouri
Tornadoes in Alabama
Tornadoes in Kentucky
Tornadoes in Georgia (U.S. state)
Tornadoes in Indiana
Tornadoes in North Carolina
Tornadoes in Virginia
Tornadoes in Pennsylvania
1977 natural disasters in the United States
April 1977 events in the United States
1977 in Alabama